Francisco Moya, O.F.M. was a Roman Catholic prelate who served as Bishop of Rubicón (1436–?).

Biography
Francisco Moya was ordained a priest in the Order of Friars Minor.
On 26 Sep 1436, he was appointed during the papacy of Pope Eugene IV as Bishop of Rubicón. 
On 27 Oct 1436, he was consecrated bishop by André Dias de Escobar, Titular Bishop of Megara. 
It is uncertain how long he served as Bishop of Rubicón; the next bishop of record is Juan de Frías, who was appointed in 1474.

References

External links and additional sources
 (for Chronology of Bishops)
 (for Chronology of Bishops)

15th-century Roman Catholic bishops in the Kingdom of Aragon
Bishops appointed by Pope Eugene IV
Franciscan bishops